Norbert Schramm (born April 7, 1960) is a German former competitive figure skater. He is a two-time European champion, a two-time World silver medalist, and a three-time German national champion.

Skating career
Schramm began skating at age six. He was coached by Erich Zeller at the national center in Oberstdorf, and skated for the EC Oberstdorf club representing West Germany. Amongst his team members were Rudi Cerne and Heiko Fischer. Along with three national titles, Schramm won gold twice at the European Championships and silver twice at the World Championships. He also attracted media attention for his red costumes, his choreography and spontaneous creativity on ice, as well as for creating new spins and reinventing old forgotten spins. 

Schramm retired from amateur competition in 1984. He became a professional world champion in Washington, D.C., United States, appeared in ice shows such as Holiday on Ice, and directed and choreographed such shows. In 1988, he began coaching figure skaters. From 2002 until 2007 he was artistic director of the ice show at Europa-Park. In 2006 he was a representative of the German "Dancing on Ice" television show.

Personal life  
Schramm has a daughter, Bernadette Schramm (born on March 4, 1994), with former wife Nicola Brown. He was also married, for less than a year, to German-American filmmaker Marianne Hettinger. Schramm lives in New York City, where he works as a full-time action and people photographer. He was Grand Marshal of the 2012 Steuben Parade in New York City.(https://web.archive.org/web/20130219062552/http://www.germanparadenyc.org/news59.html)

Results

External links 
 Norbert Schramm homepage 
 Norbert Schramm Ice show Productions
 Norbert Schramm Photographer

1960 births
Living people
Sportspeople from Nuremberg
German male single skaters
Figure skaters at the 1984 Winter Olympics
Olympic figure skaters of West Germany
World Figure Skating Championships medalists
European Figure Skating Championships medalists
Ich bin ein Star – Holt mich hier raus! participants